The 2021–22 Ashes series, named the Vodafone Men's Ashes Series for sponsorship reasons, was a series of five Test cricket matches that were contested between England and Australia for The Ashes. The series was played at five venues across Australia from 8 December 2021 and was scheduled to finish on 18 January 2022. Australia were the defending holders of the Ashes going into the series, having won in 2017–18 with the 2019 Ashes series ending in a draw. The series was part of the 2021–2023 ICC World Test Championship.

Australia retained the Ashes by winning the first three Test matches. The fourth Test ended in a draw, with Australia winning the fifth Test by 146 runs to win the series 4–0.

Squads

On 25 October 2021, Ben Stokes was added to England's squad. On 7 December 2021, James Anderson was left out of the first Test as a precaution, despite being declared fit to play. On 7 January 2022, Sam Billings was added to the squad as injury cover. Jos Buttler was ruled out of England's squad for the fifth Test, after breaking a finger during the fourth Test.

On 17 November 2021, Cricket Australia named a 15-member squad for the first two Test matches. On 19 November 2021, Tim Paine resigned from the captaincy role and, on 26 November 2021, was replaced by Pat Cummins as captain with Steve Smith as Cummins' deputy. Paine then withdrew from the squad and announced he was taking an indefinite leave of absence from cricket. On 2 December 2021, Alex Carey was added to Australia's squad as Paine's replacement and a wicket-keeper, receiving his maiden Test call-up in the process. Ahead of the second Test, Josh Hazlewood was ruled out of Australia's squad due to a side strain picked up during the first Test of the series. Pat Cummins was ruled out of the second Test after being named as a close contact of a positive COVID-19 case; Steve Smith was made captain, and Michael Neser made his Test debut for Australia. During the fifth day of the second Test, Cricket Australia named an unchanged squad for the rest of the series. Ahead of the third Test, Australia also added Scott Boland to their squad as a cover for their fast bowlers.

Notes

COVID-19 impact
The 2021–22 Ashes series took place against the backdrop of the ongoing COVID-19 pandemic, which threatened to derail the series numerous times. As far back as June 2021, concerns had been raised that key England players could pull out of the tour if their families were not able to accompany them due to the Australian government's restrictions on international travel. 

On the morning of the first day of the Second Test, Australian captain Pat Cummins was ruled out of the match after he was deemed to be a close contact of someone with COVID-19. In mid-December, a number of people at the match at Adelaide Oval tested positive, including members of the media.

On 31 December 2021, Travis Head was ruled out of the fourth test due to contracting COVID-19. Mitchell Marsh, Nic Maddinson and Josh Inglis were added to the squad as additional cover. Several key staff and officials, including ICC match referee David Boon and England coach Chris Silverwood were also forced to miss the fourth test; Boon had tested positive for COVID-19 while Silverwood was forced to isolate with his family following an outbreak of the virus in the England camp.

Venues

In May 2021, Cricket Australia (CA) announced that The Gabba, the Adelaide Oval, the Melbourne Cricket Ground (MCG), the Sydney Cricket Ground and the Perth Stadium would host the Test matches. However, in late November 2021, doubts were raised about the final Test taking place in Perth due to COVID-19 restrictions. Mark McGowan, the premier of Western Australia, insisted on a 14-day quarantine period for everyone travelling into the state. On 6 December 2021, CA confirmed the fifth Test would not be held in Perth, and that the relocated Test would be played as a day/night match. On 11 December 2021, CA confirmed that the venue for the fifth Test match would be the Bellerive Oval, in Hobart. This was the first ever Ashes Test match to be played in Hobart.

Matches

First Test

Day one
Rory Burns was bowled for a golden duck by Mitchell Starc off the first ball of the series. Dawid Malan was caught behind by Alex Carey from a delivery by Josh Hazlewood. Captain Joe Root followed with a duck after getting caught at first slip by David Warner from a delivery by Hazlewood. Ben Stokes was only able to score five runs before being caught out off a delivery by Pat Cummins. Ultimately, England was dismissed for 147 in their first innings. Although England was all out before tea, Australia were unable to begin their first innings due to weather.

Day two
Marcus Harris was only able to score three runs before being dismissed by Ollie Robinson. Marnus Labuschagne, Steve Smith, David Warner, and Cameron Green were dismissed in quick succession, going four for 29. England were unable to capitalise on three close opportunities to dismiss David Warner on 17, 48, and 60. Warner was able to score 94 runs before being caught out off a delivery by Robinson. Green was bowled out by Robinson in one ball. Australia ended the day 7/343. Travis Head was not out, having scored 112 runs with twelve fours and two sixes.

Day three
Australia were all out before lunch, with Travis Head bowled out off a yorker from Mark Wood. Australia's run total for the innings was 425, with Head contributing 152. Haseeb Hameed and Rory Burns were the first two batsmen for England's second innings. Burns was called out lbw with zero runs, but the call was overturned by DRS. Burns was later dismissed for 13 and Hameed soon followed, being dismissed for 27. The next two batsmen, Dawid Malan and Joe Root, ended the day not out with 80 and 86 runs, respectively. As a result, England ended the day trailing Australia by 58 runs.

Day four
Despite strong performances in day three, Malan and Root were only able to add two and three runs on day four before falling. Ollie Pope was the next to fall after being caught at the slip. The global broadcast from The Gabba was then cut off for approximately 30 minutes while the Test continued. After the broadcast was able to return, Stokes edged a ball from Pat Cummins and was caught out in the gully, leaving England 6/266. The next four batsmen, Jos Buttler, Chris Woakes, Ollie Robinson, and Mark Wood, were dismissed in quick succession, ending the innings. In total, England scored 297 with eight wickets and only 77 runs in day four.

With a target of 20 runs, Australia opened their second innings with Alex Carey and Marcus Harris. Carey was dismissed, but Harris was able to reach the target score before Australia's third batsman faced a ball.

Second Test

Day one 
Despite testing negative to COVID-19, Pat Cummins was forced to withdraw from the match and isolate in accordance with the South Australian government's public health regulations. Steve Smith was appointed Australian captain for the first time since his comeback from the Sandpapergate incident, while Michael Neser was named as Cummins' replacement and hastily awarded his baggy green. 

Smith won the toss and decided to bat first. Marcus Harris and David Warner opened the batting for the home team. However, Harris was out soon, caught by England wicketkeeper Jos Buttler off the bowling of Stuart Broad. Marnus Labuschagne and Warner stabilized the innings putting on a partnership of 172 runs for the second wicket before Warner was out for 95, falling five short of a century, caught by Broad off the bowling of Ben Stokes. Australia ended the day at 225 for two, with Labuschagne remaining not out at 95 (having been dropped twice by Buttler on 21 and 95) and Smith on 18 not out.

Day two 
Early in the day, Labuschagne reached his sixth test hundred with a controlled edge past second slip to the boundary. Having come off 287 balls, it was the slowest Test century by an Australian since Jason Gillespie's effort against Bangladesh in 2006. He was dismissed LBW shortly afterward on 103 by Ollie Robinson, offering no shot to a delivery. Australia reviewed the decision, however, the decision by the on-field umpire stayed. Travis Head joined the captain Smith at the wicket and the duo put on fifty runs for the fourth wicket before Head was bowled off a full toss from the bowling of English captain Joe Root. Cameron Green came to the crease but was back to the pavilion adding only two runs. Australia were at 294 for five. Wicketkeeper Alex Carey joined Smith to put on 91 runs for the sixth wicket before Smith was out leg before to James Anderson for 93. Australia reviewed the decision but the on-field umpire's decision stayed as an 'umpire's call'. Carey brought up his fifty before being out for 51 caught at cover by Haseeb Hameed off the bowling of Anderson. Australia brought up their 450 before declaring for 473 at the loss of 9 wickets.

England opened their innings with Hameed and Rory Burns, both of whom were out for single digit scores bringing England to a total of 12 runs for the loss of two wickets. Hameed was out for 6 runs caught at mid-on by Mitchell Starc off the bowling of Michael Neser, while Burns was out for 4 runs caught by Smith at second slip off the bowling of Starc. England ended the day at 17 for two with Dawid Malan remaining not out at one and Joe Root remaining not out at 5.

Day three 
Malan and Root resumed from their overnight positions and carried their bats through the first session with England getting to lunch at 140 runs for the loss of no additional wickets. Malan was unbeaten at 58 while Root was unbeaten at 40. Root was the first to be dismissed for 62 runs out caught by Smith at first slip off the bowling of Green. England were 150 for the loss of three wickets. Malan followed soon with the team adding 7 runs before Malan was out for 80 runs caught by Smith again at first slip off the bowling of Starc. England lost their next six wickets within 79 runs folding for a total of 236 runs. For the Australians Starc took four wickets conceding 37 runs, while spinner Nathan Lyon took three wickets conceding 58 runs.

Australia chose not to enforce the follow-on and ended the day 45 for one, with Warner run-out in a mixup with batsman Harris, with a combination of Broad and Buttler dislodging the stumps. Harris remained unbeaten at 21 while Neser was not out having scored two runs.

Day four 
England took the field without Root, who was being treated for a lower abdominal injury sustained in the warm up session. Stokes took over as captain during Root's brief absence. Despite this setback, England started the day well, dismissing Neser, Harris and then the captain Smith in quick succession to have Australia 55 for four. But then Robinson, who had taken two of the day's wickets, switched from seam bowling to off-spin, presumably to lift the over rate. Root returned soon afterwards to the field, but by that time Australia had steadied, Head having combined with Labuschagne and helping Australia end the first session 134 for four, leading by 371 runs.

Head was first to depart when play resumed, caught by Stokes at deep square leg off Robinson; his 51 had come off only 54 deliveries. Labuschagne also reached a half-century to back up his mighty first-innings effort before departing, also for 51, caught by Stokes (this time fielding at deep mid wicket) off the part-time leg spin of Malan, his first test wicket. Although wickets continued to fall at regular intervals, the remaining batters continued to add runs and when Smith declared at 230 for nine after Richardson had been dismissed, England had been set a winning target of 468 in the remaining four sessions.

England resumed their second innings chasing a target of 468 runs and were immediately down a wicket when Hameed was out for a duck caught by the wicketkeeper Carey off the bowling of Jhye Richardson. Malan joined Burns and the duo put on 44 runs before Malan was out for 20 runs leg before to Neser. Burns and Root followed soon after with England ending the day at 82 runs for the loss of four wickets.

Day five 
Chasing a stiff target, England were at 142 runs for six wickets at dinner with Buttler at 16 and Chris Woakes at 28. The duo added 61 runs for the seventh wicket before Woakes was out for 44 runs out, bowled Richardson. Buttler, having faced 207 deliveries, trod on his stumps trying to work a cut behind square; his was the ninth wicket and England were all out for 192. Australia won the game by 275 runs, going 2-0 up in the five-match series. Labuschagne was named player of the match for his century in the first innings and half century in the second innings, while Richardson was the pick of the bowlers, taking five wickets for 42 runs.

Third Test

Day one
England made four changes to its team, with Jonny Bairstow, Zak Crawley, Jack Leach and Mark Wood replacing Stuart Broad, Rory Burns, Ollie Pope and Chris Woakes. Australia also made some changes, with Jhye Richardson and Michael Neser making way for Pat Cummins returning as captain, and debutant Scott Boland, a local boy who became only the fourth Indigenous Australian cricketer to play at Test level. After the start of play was delayed by rain, England's batting woes at the top of the order continued, with Cummins having dismissed openers Hameed and Crawley with only 13 runs on the board. It was yet again up to Root and Malan to rescue the innings, and the pair added 48 runs before Malan lost his wicket on the last ball before lunch, caught in the slips by Warner off Cummins for 14. England's score was 61 for three.

England found themselves in trouble early in the Test after being bowled out with 185 runs.

Warner and Harris gave Australia its best start of the series, combining for an opening stand of 57 in 14 overs before Warner fell for a brisk 38 (off 42 balls) when a thick edge off Anderson was caught by Crawley at gully. Lyon was sent in as nightwatchman for the remaining two overs as Australia ended the day's play at 61 for one.

Day two

The start of the second day was delayed by half an hour after it was revealed that four non-playing members of the England squad – two support staff and two family members – had tested positive to COVID-19. Australia increased their run total to 267 before being bowled out. Anderson claimed three more wickets to bring his total to 4/33 in the first innings.

England once again found themselves in trouble early in the innings. Mitchell Starc dismissed Zak Crawley and Dawid Malan on consecutive deliveries in the fifth over. In the eleventh over, Scott Boland dismissed Haseeb Hameed and Jack Leach in three balls. Day two ended with England 4/31 and trailing Australia by 51 runs.

Day three
In the fifth over of the day, Starc bowled Ben Stokes out with England at 5/46. Boland dismissed the next four batsmen (Jonny Bairstow, Joe Root, Mark Wood, and Ollie Robinson) with ducks from Wood and Robinson. Cameron Green bowled James Anderson out to end the Test with Australia winning by an innings and 14 runs. England's score of 68 runs was their lowest innings score on Australian soil since 1904; their previous lowest had also come at the MCG.

Boland earned the Mullagh Medal after taking six wickets for seven runs during England's second innings.

Fourth Test

Fifth Test

Statistics

Leading runscorers

Abbreviations: H / S – Highest score in an innings; S / R – Strike rate: runs per 100 balls faced

Leading wicket-takers

Broadcasting
The series was broadcast on television in Australia by the Seven Network and Fox Sports. BT Sport televised the series in the United Kingdom and Ireland.

Notes

References

External links
 Series home at ESPNcricinfo

The Ashes
International cricket competitions in 2021–22
Ashes series
Ashes series
Ashes